Giovanni Domenico Lombardi (1682–1751) was an Italian painter of the late-Baroque period in Lucca. He shows the influence of rising neoclassicism but enveloped by an attention to Caravaggist quotations. He was a pupil of Giovanni Marracci in Lucca. He was likely influenced by Pietro Paolino (died 1681).

Works
St Francis Xavier blessing those afflicted with the plague, Musée des beaux-arts de Chambéry.
Interior of Palace with countryside view
Allegories of Faith and Charity
 Twenty-two tableaux, Rougnat church, Creuse (Limousin).

Further reading
Betti Paola, Giovan Domenico Lombardi : nei Musei nazionali di Lucca, Pacini Fazzi publication, 2003.

External links

Lombardi on Web Gallery of Art.

1682 births
1751 deaths
17th-century Italian painters
Italian male painters
18th-century Italian painters
Painters from Lucca
Italian Baroque painters
18th-century Italian male artists